The Hermitage of Mãe de Deus, is a hermitage situated on the hilltop of Ladeira da Mãe de Deus in the civil parish of São Pedro in the municipality of Ponta Delgada. The hermitage is notable for the intricately detailed cornerstones in black basalt coated in plaster, and painted in white. The stonework is primarily in the main facade and practically all of the area around the temple.

History 

The primitive hermitage of the Alto da Mãe de Deus was erected under the initiative of Diogo Afonso da Costa Columbreiro, who resided near the site in the 16th century. The chapel was then built on the land of the former Fort of Mãe de Deus, which had been deactivated.

During the First World War, the original temple was demolished in 1915, under the supposition that the site would be used as a landmark for attaching German U-Boats. The azulejo tile from the site was collected from the demolished site and housed in the Museum of Ponta Delgada.

Sometime after the conflict (in 1925), many of the devout residents voted to reconstruct the chapel. Therefore, on 25 March 1925, the cornerstone was placed on the site of the old chapel, following a grande procession that left the church of São Pedro and open-air mass celebrated by Father Herculano Augusto de Medeiros. In the interior, part of the cornerstone was enclosed in a glass box with a proclamation in Latin, then spoken by Father Ledo de Bettencourt at the ceremony. After the reading Father José Jacinto Botelho, from Furnas, read a speech that impressed the gathered crowd.

The project followed the plans of architect Norberto Correia, in the Neo-Baroque style. Delays occurred during the Second World War, and in 1942, the hilltop of Mãe de Deus was occupied by a garrison of Portuguese troops, to watch the port of Ponta Delgada.

The temple was finally concluded at the beginning of 1947, and delivered into the possession of the ecclesiastical authorities on 25 March, when the temple was consecrated by Father José Gomes, Ouvidor Eclesiástico.

Architecture

Located in an isolated urban context, implanted on an elevated hilltop over the historic Fort of Mãe de Deus, with plastered walls, relatively close to the University of the Azores. The church's frontal access is marked by a basalt staircase of two flights, flanked by rectangular plinths, plastered and painted in white, caped by faceted pillars and two orders of plinths. The courtyard is covered in sod, and dotted by trees.

A 19th century chapel, in the late Neo-Baroque style, identifiable by the proliferation of decorative elements. The structure alternately shows variations in the use of the carved lobes, concave cornices, the large number of pendants, false aprons and backs. The curved frieze that surrounds the large window and divides the body refers is an element of the Estado Novo era, with an inscription alluding to the patron.

The hermitage consists of a polygonal plan with nave and left-hand bell-tower, with articulated volumes and differentiated spaces with tiled roofs. The facades are plastered and painted in white, with stonework running throughout, flanked by pilastered wedges, and rectangular plinths, topped with friezes and cornices.

The main facade (which is oriented to the west) is decorated with a gable, cut and ornamented in spiral decoration, surmounted by cornices and Latin cross over double plinths. The main portal in a polylobial arch, includes several frames, flanked by two orders of pilasters and two columns built into the wall, surmounted by friezes over rectangular plinths. These plinths include inferior plinths supporting fragments of the portico and superior plinths with angular cornices, that extend until the corners, and pinnacles similar to balustrades. Between the portal and corners, are small backrests with the Portuguese shield. Over the cornices are quadrangular oculi, with circular frames of spiral and shell motifs with frieses, containing interlaced motifs and inscription, surmounted by volumous cartazes and shell with the monogram "AM" (MATER DEI, Latin for Mother of God).

References 
Notes

Sources
 

Mae de Deus
Buildings and structures in Ponta Delgada